Chae Eui-jin is a South Korean voice actress who joined the Tooniverse Voice Acting Division in 1997, which she left for the Munhwa Broadcasting Corporation's Voice Acting Division in 1999.

Roles

Broadcast TV
 Futari wa Pretty Cure (Korea TV Edition, SBS)
 Magical DoReMi (Magical Remi from 1st - 3rd Series, Korea TV Edition, MBC and 4th series, Korea TV Edition, Tooniverse)
 CSI: Crime Scene Investigation (extra guest, Korea TV Series, MBC)
 CSI: Miami (extra guest, Korea TV Edition, MBC)
 Chobits (Korea TV Edition, Tooniverse)
 Dr. Slump (Korea TV Edition, MBC)
 Bikkuriman (Bumerang Fighter, Korea TV Edition, MBC)
 Wa E-Nice World (narration, MBC)
 TV Clinic (narration, KBS)
 E3 Game (narration, MBC Game)
 Gangbada (Korea TV Edition, MBC)
 Dolphin Plliper (Korea TV Edition, MBC)
 Dog Charlie (Korea TV Edition, MBC)
 Metal Jack (Korea TV Edition, Tooniverse)
 Wangbawoo (Korea TV Edition, MBC)
 Doraemon (Korea TV Edition, MBC)
 Mononoke Hime (Korea TV Edition by OVA, Tooniverse)
 Glass Mask (Korea TV Edition, Tooniverse)
 Hit 50 Years (Radio Drama, MBC)
 Cartoon Fight (Radio Drama in Hotel Africa, MBC)
 Iron Kid (KBS)
 Winx Club (SBS) - Musa
 The Powerpuff Girls (Cartoon Network) (Bubbles)
 Powerpuff Girls Z (Cartoon Network)(Sara Bellum, Peach, Lil' Arturo, Miko Shirogane, Kuriko Akatsutsumi)

Movie dubbing
What Women Want (Korea TV Edition, MBC)
Bucsy (Korea TV Edition, MBC)
Antonia's Line (Korea TV Edition, MBC)
Bring it On (Korea TV Edition, MBC)
Random Hearts (Korea TV Edition, MBC)
Sim Dong (Korea TV Edition, MBC)
Entrapment (Korea TV Edition, MBC)
Yulee's Gold (Korea TV Edition, MBC)
Dark City (Korea TV Edition, MBC)
There's Something About Mary (Korea TV Edition, MBC)
Nick of Time (Korea TV Edition, MBC)
Twilight (Korea TV Edition, MBC) (Replacing Kristen Stewart)

Games
Sentimental Graffiti - Taeko Adachi
Tokimeki Memorial - Rei Ijyuin / Miharu Tatebayashi

Other life
Asiana Airlines - Kids Club Magic Miles Friends
Yoon's English
KTF - Coloring Main Guide
Seoul International Cartoon Festival - Just voice actor event

See also
Munhwa Broadcasting Corporation
MBC Voice Acting Division

External links
Daum Cafe Voice Actor Chae Eui-jin Homepage 
MBC Voice Acting division Chae Eui-jin blog 
Ad Sound Chae Eui-jin blog 

Living people
South Korean voice actresses
Year of birth missing (living people)